Jacob Benjamin Draper (born 24 July 1998) is a Welsh field hockey player who plays as a defender for Belgian club Beerschot and the Wales and Great Britain national teams.

Club career
Draper will play for Belgian club Beerschot in the 2021–22 season.

He has been playing club hockey in the Men's England Hockey League Premier Division for Hampstead & Westminster.

Prior to that he played for Cardiff & Met.

International career
Draper made his senior debut, aged 18, for Wales on 28 August 2016, in a  5–1 win over Austria in Vienna, Austria. He played for Wales at Hockey at the 2018 Commonwealth Games in Gold Coast and 2019 Men's EuroHockey Nations Championship, where they finished 6th.

References

External links
Profile on Great Britain Hockey

1998 births
Living people
Sportspeople from Cwmbran
Welsh male field hockey players
British male field hockey players
Male field hockey defenders
Field hockey players at the 2018 Commonwealth Games
Hampstead & Westminster Hockey Club players
Men's England Hockey League players
Commonwealth Games competitors for Wales
Field hockey players at the 2020 Summer Olympics
Olympic field hockey players of Great Britain
Royal Beerschot THC players
Men's Belgian Hockey League players
2023 Men's FIH Hockey World Cup players